O A e o Z (also known as A e o Z, or "A" e o "Z", Portuguese: The A and the Z) is an album by Brazilian rock band Os Mutantes. It was their first record without founding member Rita Lee, and marked a shift in their sound to progressive rock. Recorded in 1973, but shelved until 1992, this was Arnaldo Baptista's last studio record with the group.

Track listing

Personnel
Os Mutantes
 Arnaldo Baptista - Hammond organ L100, Mellotron M400, Hohner clavinet C, cello, lead and backing vocals
 Sérgio Dias - electric (Régulus II and Fender Stratocaster) and 12-string acoustic guitars, sitar, lead and backing vocals
 Liminha - bass guitar (Regulus and Rickenbacker 4001), acoustic guitar, backing vocals
 Dinho Leme - drums, tabla, backing vocals

References 

1992 albums
Os Mutantes albums
Polydor Records albums
Portuguese-language albums